Mhleli Dlamini (born 25 July 1994) is a South African rugby union player for the  in the Currie Cup and . His regular position is prop.

Dlamini was named in the  squad for the 2021 Currie Cup Premier Division.

References

South African rugby union players
1994 births
Living people
Rugby union props
Blue Bulls players
Griffons (rugby union) players
Bulls (rugby union) players
Rugby union players from Durban
Tel Aviv Heat players
South African expatriate sportspeople in Israel
South African expatriate rugby union players
Expatriate rugby union players in Israel